Dicentra canadensis, the squirrel corn, is a flowering plant from eastern North America with oddly shaped white flowers and finely divided leaves.

Description
Squirrel corn has small yellow clustered bulblets (looking roughly like kernels of corn), finely dissected leaves, and white heart-shaped flowers. The flowers are fragrant. It is a spring ephemeral, leafing out and flowering in spring and going dormant in summer.

Distribution and habitat
It is native to deciduous woodland in eastern North America. It is also found among rock outcrops near mountains.

References

 
 Bleeding hearts, Corydalis, and their relatives. Mark Tebbitt, Magnus Lidén, and Henrik Zetterlund. Timber Press. 2008.

External links

canadensis
Ephemeral plants
Flora of Eastern Canada
Flora of the Eastern United States
Flora of the Appalachian Mountains
Garden plants of North America